Abdulaziz Laval (born 20 December 1992) is a Nigerian footballer playing currently for Orsha.

References

External links
 
 
 Profile at teams.by

1992 births
Living people
Nigerian footballers
Association football midfielders
Nigerian expatriate footballers
Expatriate footballers in Belarus
FC Naftan Novopolotsk players
FC Orsha players
Place of birth missing (living people)